The Shrine Bowl was a postseason college football bowl game. The first game was played on December 18, 1948, at War Memorial Stadium in Little Rock, Arkansas, between Hardin–Simmons University and Ouachita Baptist College. The 1949 edition was held in Carbondale, Illinois, as the Indiana State Sycamores faced the Southern Illinois Salukis.

Game result

A series of games sponsored by the Shriners as a charity event in Honolulu in December 1941 and referred to by some as the Shrine Bowl was interrupted by the Japanese attack on Pearl Harbor. Teams from Willamette University and San Jose State travelled to Hawaii to play against each other and the University of Hawaii. The Willamette team lost to the Hawaiians in the opening game on Saturday, December 6, but other games were cancelled due to the onset of the war. The teams were among the first civilians evacuated in a convoy to San Francisco a couple of weeks later.

See also
 List of college bowl games

References

Defunct college football bowls
Shriners
1948 in sports
American football in Indiana
American football in Arkansas